Jesús Arango Cano (21 June 1915 – 9 January 2015) was a Colombian economist, diplomat, anthropologist, archaeologist and writer.

Biography 
Arango Cano was born in La Tebaida, Colombia, a village that his father, archaeologist Luis Arango Cardona, founded a year after his birth. He attended the Rutgers Preparatory School in New Brunswick, New Jersey and studied Economy at the University of California and later International Relations at Columbia University, New York.

In the 1940s Arango Cano became consul for Colombia in São Paulo, Brazil and Undersecretary of International Relations.

Arango Cano has written more than fifty books of which 40 are published. His first two books were Inmigración para Colombia, published in 1951, and Inmigración y Colonización en la Gran Colombia in 1953.

In 1965 Arango published his book Mitos, leyendas y dioses chibchas, about the myths, legends and deities of the Muisca. He also wrote about the Quimbaya, Calima and other indigenous groups, not only of Colombia, but also about the Aztec and Incas. Arango published about the Eje Cafetero, the coffee region in central Colombia where he was born.

In the 1970s, Arango Cano followed his father and became an archaeologist. In 1974 his work Las esmeraldas sagradas: el tesoro de Furatena about Furatena, mythological figure for the Muzo people was published.

On May 23, 1980, Arango Cano together with other historians founded the Academia de Historia del Quindío.

Jesús Arango Cano has published mainly in Spanish and also in English and German.

Arango Cano died in Armenia, Quindío, on January 9, 2015, at age 99.

Works 
This list is a selection.

Books 
 1996 - Cuentos y relatos de la vida real
 1991 - Fantasías del corazón
 1989 - Mitología en América precolombina : México-aztecas, Colombia-chibchas, Perú-incas
 1987 - Las dos caras de Estados Unidos
 1976 - Cerámica quimbaya y calima
 1974 - Las esmeraldas sagradas: el tesoro de Furatena
 1971 - Cuentos y anécdotas de mi tierra
 1969 - Diálogos cafeteros
 1962 - Capitalismo, comunismo y libertad
 1959 - Estados Unidos, mito y realidad
 1957 - La industria mundial del cafe
 1955 - Geografía física y económica de Colombia
 1953 - Inmigración y colonización en la Grancolombia

Articles 
 2000 - Y hablando de ortografía
 1999 - En defensa de la gramática y a propósito de la "ch" y la "ll"
 1997 - Cervantes, don Quijote y el amor
 1979 - La dimensión espacial de la crisis en España

See also 

List of Muisca scholars
Muisca

References

Notable works by Arango Cano 
 

1915 births
2015 deaths
Colombian anthropologists
20th-century Colombian historians
Colombian archaeologists
Muisca scholars
Rutgers Preparatory School alumni